Lenca Rugby Club is a Honduran rugby club based in La Esperanza, Honduras and a founding member of the Honduran Rugby Federation.

Lenca Rugby (La Esperanza Rugby Football Club) is a rugby club based in La Esperanza, Intibuca, Honduras. It is affiliated with the Federacion Hondurena de Rugby. The club currently fields a 15s and 7s senior team. Members of the club are also responsible for training youth players in LA Eserpanza..

Honours
 2nd Place in National Sevens Tournament on Roatan  in 2014
 2nd Place in National Fifteens Tournament in La Ceiba  in 2014
 Took part in first ever recorded inter club fifteens game in Honduras against Roatan Pirates in August 2013
 Took part in first ever recorded inter club tens game in Honduras against Tegucigalpa Tapires in 2013.

External links
Lenca Rugby Website

Rugby union in Honduras
Rugby clubs established in 2012